Coleophora heinrichella is a moth of the family Coleophoridae. It is found in Canada, including Ontario.

The larvae feed on the leaves of Rudbeckia, Helianthus and Aster species. They create a trivalved, tubular silken case.

References

heinrichella
Moths described in 1933
Moths of North America